Galbibacter mesophilus is a Gram-negative and rod-shaped bacterium from the genus of Galbibacter which has been isolated from sediments from the Okinawa Island in Japan.

References

Flavobacteria
Bacteria described in 2007